The Langhian is, in the ICS geologic timescale, an age or stage in the middle Miocene Epoch/Series. It spans the time between 15.97 ± 0.05 Ma and 13.65 ± 0.05 Ma (million years ago) during the Middle Miocene.

The Langhian was a continuing warming period  defined by Lorenzo Pareto in 1865, it was originally established in the Langhe area north of Ceva in northern Italy, hence the name. The Langhian is preceded by the Burdigalian and followed by the Serravallian Stage.

Stratigraphic definition
The base of the Langhian is defined by the first appearance of foraminifer species Praeorbulina glomerosa and is also coeval with the top of magnetic chronozone C5Cn.1n. A GSSP for the Langhian Stage was not yet established in 2009.

The top of the Langhian Stage (the base of the Serravallian Stage) is at the first occurrence of fossils of the nanoplankton species Sphenolithus heteromorphus and is located in magnetic chronozone C5ABr.

The Langhian is coeval with the Orleanian and Astaracian European Land Mammal Mega Zones (more precisely: with biozones MN5 and MN6, MN6 starts just below the Langhian-Serravallian boundary), with the upper Hemingfordian to mid-Barstovian North American Land Mammal Ages, with mid-Relizian to Luisian Californian regional stages (the Luisian extends barely into the early Serravallian), with the early-mid Badenian Paratethys stage of Central and eastern Europe, with the Tozawan stage in Japan (which runs barely into the early Serravallian), with the late Batesfordian through Balcombian to early Bairnsdalian Australian stages and with the mid-Cliffdenian to mid-Lillburnian New Zealand stages.

Paleontology

Reptiles
 Turtles: Meiolania brevicollis

Cartilaginous fish
Sharks, rays, skates and relatives
 Chlamydoselachidae: †Chlamydoselachus tobleri
 Hexanchidae: Hexanchus griseus (includes "H. andersoni" and "H. gigas"), Hexanchus nakamurai (includes "H. vitulus"), Notorynchus cepedianus (includes "N. kempi" and "N. primigenius")

Mammals
 Perissodactyla 
 Rhinocerotidae: †Dicerorhinus sansaniensis
 Rodentia
 Cricetidae: †Karydomys
 Sciuridae: †Palaeosciurus, ?Ratufa

Climate
In August 2021, the 6th IPCC report indicated that global temperature was 4°C– 10°C warmer during the Miocene Climatic Optimum (16.9-14.7 Ma ago) than 1850-1900.

See also
 Middle Miocene disruption
 Nördlinger Ries impact crater

References

Footnotes

Literature

; 2004: A Geologic Time Scale 2004, Cambridge University Press.
; 1865: Note sur les subdivisions que l'on pourrait établir dans les terrains tertaires de l'Apennin septentrional, Bulletin de la Société Géologique de France 2(22), p. 210-277. PDF

External links
GeoWhen Database - Langhian
Neogene timescale, at the website of the subcommission for stratigraphic information of the ICS
 Neogene timescale at the website of the Norwegian network of offshore records of geology and stratigraphy

 
03
 
Miocene geochronology
Geological ages